Aaron Douglas Berry, Jr. (born June 25, 1988) is an American football cornerback who is currently a free agent. He played college football at Pittsburgh. He was signed by the Detroit Lions as an undrafted free agent in 2010.  Berry has also been a member of the New York Jets and the Cleveland Browns of the NFL and the Toronto Argonauts and the Hamilton Tiger-Cats of the CFL.

College career
Berry's career at the University of Pittsburgh began in 2006 as a key contributor on special teams as well as a reserve cornerback. He played in all 12 games and recorded his first two tackles and two pass breakups in a game against UCF.

As a sophomore in 2007, Berry played in all 12 games and started the last 9 games of the season. Throughout the season, Berry recorded 19 tackles and a team-high of two interceptions and tied for second on the team with five PBUs. One of his best performances on special teams and in the secondary was in the win against Syracuse.  He averaged 17.7 yards on six punt returns and his 53-yard return at the end of the third quarter put Pitt at the Orange 13. Berry also had four tackles and broke up three passes including Syracuse's desperation pass to the Pitt 5 with one second left.  Berry also  had strong performances against Cincinnati, where he intercepted a deep ball at the Pitt 17 with 2:58 left, as well as two key tackles and a four-yard sack at Michigan State.

As a junior in 2008, Berry was named All-Big East second-team. He accumulated 41 tackles, one sack, three interceptions, a team-high of 10 PBUs and 76 yards on 14 punt returns (5.4 avg). One of his three interceptions came in the Sun Bowl vs. Oregon State and matched his career high of three PBUs. He had one interception in the Rutgers game and another against Connecticut that he ran back for 52 yards. In the 2008 game against Notre Dame, Berry had a career high nine tackles and followed it up the next game with 7 vs. Iowa. Berry had a four-yard sack against Buffalo, a season-long punt return for 24-years vs. Syracuse, and three PBUs against Louisville.

During his senior year, Berry was a Jim Thorpe Award candidate. While struggling with a shoulder injury, Berry had a combined total of 31 tackles with 25 solo and 6 assisted tackles. He had one interception during his senior year and returned it for 14 yards.

Professional career

Detroit Lions
In 2010, Berry was signed by the Lions as an undrafted free agent. He was cut by the Lions on July 23, 2012.

On August 20, 2012, he was suspended for 3 games.

New York Jets
Berry signed a two-year contract with the New York Jets on October 1, 2012. During his first season with the Jets, Berry played in seven games and contributed two tackles. He was placed on injured reserve on December 27, 2012.

On July 26, 2013, Berry suffered a torn ACL during training camp and was placed on injured reserve the following day.

Cleveland Browns
Berry was signed by the Cleveland Browns on June 2, 2014. He was waived on September 9, 2014.

References

External links
New York Jets bio
Pittsburgh Panthers bio

1988 births
Living people
Sportspeople from Harrisburg, Pennsylvania
Players of American football from Harrisburg, Pennsylvania
American football cornerbacks
Canadian football defensive backs
American players of Canadian football
Pittsburgh Panthers football players
Detroit Lions players
New York Jets players
Cleveland Browns players
Toronto Argonauts players
Hamilton Tiger-Cats players